The 2013–14 SV Werder Bremen season is the 104th season in the club's history. In 2013–14, the club participated in the Bundesliga, the top tier of German football. It is the club's 32nd consecutive season in this league, having been promoted from the 2. Bundesliga in 1981.

The club also took part in the 2013–14 edition of the DFB-Pokal.

Matches

Legend

Friendly matches

Pre-season

Bundesliga

League results and fixtures

League table

DFB-Pokal

References

SV Werder Bremen seasons
Werder Bremen